Bad Vibes Forever is the fourth and final studio album by American rapper and singer XXXTentacion. It is his second posthumous solo album following his death on June 18, 2018. The album was released on December 6, 2019, and features guest appearances from Lil Wayne, Blink-182, Tory Lanez, Stefflon Don, Mavado, Ky-Mani Marley, Rick Ross, Vybz Kartel, Joey Badass, Trippie Redd and others.

"Royalty" was released on July 19, 2019, as Bad Vibes Forever's lead single. "Hearteater", originally a scrapped track from ?, was officially released on October 22, 2019. Bad Vibes Forever failed to match the chart success of XXXTentacion's previous albums, debuting at number five on the Billboard 200.

Background
Bad Vibes Forever was initially planned as XXXTentacion's debut album, with a slated release date of October 31, 2016. In a March 2017 interview, XXXTentacion stated he was working on Bad Vibes Forever alongside 17. 17 was released as his debut album in August 2017, followed by the EP A Ghetto Christmas Carol in December. That same month, XXXTentacion announced that his next three albums would be titled ?, Skins, and Bad Vibes Forever.

XXXTentacion's second studio album ? was released in March 2018, the last project he released before being murdered in June 2018. His first posthumous album, Skins, was released in December 2018. On the anniversary of his murder, his estate announced an upcoming album and documentary planned for the year. Billboard confirmed the album's title as Bad Vibes Forever in August 2019, with a slated release for fall 2019. The album was reported to feature guest appearances from Stefflon Don, Lil Wayne, Lil Nas X, Trippie Redd, Rick Ross, Joey Badass and more.  However, the song featuring Lil Nas X would later be scrapped; stating that the fans didn't want it at first, it was because of one of Lil Nas X's tweets from his old Twitter account. But it was resolved, right around the corner from the release of the album. On August 25, 2019, the songs "Hearteater" and "School Shooters (ft. Lil Wayne)" were confirmed for the album.

On November 12, 2019, a teaser for the album and XXXTentacion's clothing line, also titled Bad Vibes Forever, was released through his Instagram story. In the video, the album was presented as "the final album".

On November 20, 2019, the album's cover art was teased on social media by XXXTentacion's mother who stated that the album would be "coming soon". A followup album trailer revealed the release date for December 6, 2019.

Promotion
"Royalty", featuring Ky-Mani Marley, Stefflon Don and Vybz Kartel, was released on July 19, 2019, as the album's lead single.

"Hearteater", originally a scrapped track from ?, was teased on October 18, 2019, with a picture of XXXTentacion's ex-girlfriend, Geneva Ayala, eating a bloody heart.  The single was officially released on October 22, 2019.  A music video for the track was also announced, and features Ayala, who had previously accused the rapper of domestic abuse. The music video was released on October 25, 2019.

The album's title track, featuring Trippie Redd and PnB Rock, was released on November 22, 2019, following a teaser video released the day before.  The teaser video showed the two artists, as well as Billie Eilish and Lil Skies, recounting the impact XXXTentacion had on their lives, with Eilish referring to the artist as "a beam of light [that] tried to do everything for other people".

Critical reception

According to Metacritic, which calculated an average score of 55 based on six reviews, the album received "mixed or average reviews". Kyann-Sian Williams, writing for NME, called the album "better than last year's Skins, but still a case of diminishing returns" and "a serious case of over-embellishing thin material".

Commercial performance
Bad Vibes Forever debuted at number five on the US Billboard 200 with 65,000 album-equivalent units.

Official videos 
 Royalty (October 2, 2019)
 HEARTEATER (October 25, 2019)
 bad vibes forever (December 5, 2019)
 Hot Gyal (December 12, 2019)
 School Shooters (April 10, 2020)
 CHASE / glass shards (October 16, 2020)

Track listing
Track listing adapted from Tidal.

Notes
 "Bad Vibes Forever" briefly appeared on the mixtape A Love Letter to You 4 by Trippie Redd.
 "Introduction", "Bad Vibes Forever", "Before I Realize", "The Interlude That Never Ends", "Wanna Grow Old (I Won't Let Go)", and "Numb the Pain" are stylized in all lowercase.
 "Ugly", "Limbo", "The Only Time I Feel Alive", "Attention!", "Hearteater", and "It's All Fading to Black" are stylized in all caps.
 "Chase / Glass Shards" is stylized as "CHASE / glass shards".
 "Daemons" is a remix of an earlier XXXTentacion song which was titled "Who The Fuck is God?" and originally featured J Soul.
 "Ecstasy" is a reproduction of an earlier XXXTentacion song of the same name.
"Voss" is a re-release with different credentials. It was Sauce Walka's "Voss featuring XXXTentacion". and was on his album Drip God. Carnage only took producer credits.
"Northstar (Remix)" is a remix of an earlier XXXTentacion song named Shining Like The Northstar and has a new beat from Mally Mall and Ronny J.

Personnel
Credits adapted from AllMusic.

 XXXTentacion - vocals, production, executive production, composition
 PnB Rock - vocals, composition
 Cleopatra Bernard - executive producer
 Carnage (DJ) - composer
 Mavado (singer) - composer
 Brandon Brown - mixing assistant
 Johann Chavez - engineer
 Gary Clark - mixing assistant
 JonFX - composer
 John Cunningham - bass, composer, drums, engineer, guitar, mixing, percussion, piano, producer, programming, string arrangements, synthesizer, vocal producer
 Noah Cyrus - featured artist
 Brian Eisner - engineer
 XXYYXX - composer, engineer
 Tom G - featured artist
 Isiah Gage - strings
 Dylan Getz - design, packaging
 Thomas L. Godbolt - composer
 Viva Goings - mixing assistant
 Koen Heldens - mixing
 Billy Hickey - engineer
 Juan "Saucy" Peña - engineer
 Mark Hoppus - composer
 Josh Humber - composer
 Ronny J - composer
 Kemba - engineer, featured artist
 Joey Badass - featured artist
 Paul Judge - composer, producer
 Ted Kay - composer
 Killstation - featured artist, mixing, producer
 Dave Kutch - mastering
 Tory Lanez - featured artist
 Jimmy Levy - composer, featured artist
 Lil Wayne - composer, featured artist
 Rico Love - vocal producer
 Joyner Lucas - featured artist
 Mally Mall - producer
 Matt Malpass - engineer
 Ky-Mani Marley - composer, featured artist
 Sauce Miyagi - engineer, mixing
 Sergio Montoya - design, packaging
 Duong Nyugen - design, packaging
 Robbie Owens-Russo - design, packaging
 Vybz Kartel - composer
 Juan "Saucy" Pena - engineer
 Kevin Peterson - mastering assistant
 Chris Quock - mixing assistant
 John Rodriguez - composer
 Rick Ross - featured artist
 Kristina Santa - assistant engineer
 Sauce Walka - composer, featured artist
 Ikabod Veins - composer, featured artist
 Jasper Sheff - composer, keyboards, producer
 Alexander "Smitty" Smith - engineer
 Solomon "Sounds" Sobande - management
 Cheng Sok - design packaging
 Robbie Soukiasyan - composer, drums, engineer, guitar, mixing, producer, string arrangements, string engineer 
 Stefflon Don - featured artist
 Yang Tan - engineer
 Jorge Tavares - engineer
 Trippie Redd - featured artist
 Cool & Dre - composer
 Anneka Warburton - composer
 Craig Xen - composer, featured artist
 Gerard Yusuf - engineer
 Oscar Zayas - engineer

Charts

Weekly charts

Year-end charts

References

XXXTentacion albums
2019 albums
Albums published posthumously
Empire Distribution albums
Albums produced by Mally Mall
Alternative rock albums by American artists
Alternative R&B albums